Couse Hill is a mountain located in the Catskill Mountains of New York southeast of Unadilla. Vandervort Hill is located north and Pine Hill is located northwest of Couse Hill.

References

Mountains of Delaware County, New York
Mountains of New York (state)